Desert Orchid (11 April 1979 – 13 November 2006), known as Dessie, was an English racehorse. The grey achieved a revered and esteemed status within National Hunt racing, where he was much loved by supporters for his front-running attacking style, iron will and extreme versatility. He was rated the fifth-best National Hunt horse of all time by Timeform. During his racing career he was partnered by five different jump jockeys: Colin Brown, Richard Linley, Simon Sherwood, Graham Bradley and Richard Dunwoody.

Early career

Desert Orchid's first race occurred in 1983 and during his early career his regular rider was Colin Brown, who partnered him 42 times in all, winning 17. He fell heavily at the last in a Kempton novice hurdle and took such a long time to get to his feet that it seemed his first race might be his last. Desert Orchid had a successful novice hurdle career in the 1983–84 season winning several races in a row including the Kingwell Pattern Hurdle, a long established Champion Hurdle trial, at Wincanton. 

1983/84 - In the Champion Hurdle, Desert Orchid made much of the running, alongside favourite (and winner) Dawn Run, before weakening from the second last, ultimately finishing well beaten.

1984/85 - David Elsworth's grey was no longer eligible for novice hurdles and struggled to recapture his early form. He won one of his eight starts this season, in February at Sandown Park. He was pulled up in the Champion Hurdle at Cheltenham Racecourse, the Welsh Champion Hurdle, and on his final outing of the season fell at Ascot.

Steeplechase career
1985/86 - Desert Orchid was then switched to steeplechasing, still partnered by his regular hurdles jockey Colin Brown, and ran up a sequence of four wins in a row at Devon and Exeter, Sandown and Ascot (twice) before unseating at Ascot. He did not win again that season despite three further placed efforts. He was well clear in his final race of the season at Ascot only to make a very serious mistake which stopped his momentum. He eventually finished fifth.

Back at Ascot, he won over 2 miles before returning to Kempton Park for the King George VI Chase, where he ran out a 15 length winner over Door Latch, easily defeating stars such as Wayward Lad, Forgive n'Forget, Combs Ditch and Bolands Cross. The quality of the field can be indicated by Desert Orchid's starting price of 16/1—though the price was also influenced by fears that this speedy front runner would not stay the 3 mile trip. This was jockey Simon Sherwood's first ride on Desert Orchid, the start of a partnership that was successful nine times in their ten races together. Colin Brown, who rode Desert Orchid in more than half his races, partnered his better-fancied stablemate Combs Ditch instead.

Desert Orchid followed up with wins at Sandown and Wincanton, before finishing third in the Queen Mother Champion Chase at Cheltenham, three lengths behind Pearlyman. He returned to win over 2½ miles at Ascot before being pulled up in the Whitbread Gold Cup on his final outing of the 1986–87 season.

A string of places followed in 1987, second at Sandown (2 miles), second in the King George, and places at Sandown, Wincanton and Cheltenham. Desert Orchid got his head in front on his last two starts of the 1987–88 season taking the Martell Cup at Aintree, which was his first win on a left-handed track, and the Whitbread Gold Cup at Sandown.

One of Desert Orchid's greatest efforts took place in the 1989 Victor Chandler Handicap Chase, where he took on four rivals, including the top-class Panto Prince and Vodkatini, who fell badly on the back straight. He gave the former 22 pounds and the latter 23 pounds. Desert Orchid just got back up after being headed to beat Panto Prince by a head.

Desert Orchid was then stepped up to 3 miles and 2 furlongs (5.23 km) for the Cheltenham Gold Cup—he had previously been considered a two-miler. The rain and snow which had fallen relentlessly at Cheltenham made the racecourse going heavy. These were conditions hardly suited to Desert Orchid, especially at this left-handed course which he never particularly favoured.

A crowd of over 58,000 witnessed Desert Orchid's effort to overhaul the mud-loving Yahoo in the final stages of the race. After his one and a half length victory, Desert Orchid's rider, Simon Sherwood said: "I've never known a horse so brave. He hated every step of the way in the ground and dug as deep as he could possibly go". Three cheers were called as Desert Orchid was unsaddled, surrounded by thousands of fans. The race was voted best horse race ever by readers of the Racing Post.

After eight consecutive wins, Desert Orchid then fell in the Martell Cup, which he had won the previous year (and which on this occasion was won by the Gold Cup runner-up, Yahoo). This was the first time Desert Orchid had run and failed to win since the 1988 Queen Mother Champion Chase over a year earlier.

In 1989, Desert Orchid again won at Wincanton, this time with a new jockey, Richard Dunwoody. After a second in the Tingle Creek Chase, he headed for Kempton, where he took his third King George, this time as the 4/6 favourite. He followed up with a win at Wincanton and then took the Racing Post Chase at Kempton. The Racing Post Chase of that year included many top-class handicappers and graded horses but Desert Orchid, carrying the huge weight of 12 stone & 3 pounds (77.6 kg), beat the opposition, led by the top-class Delius – a feat the official handicapper said could not be done on ratings. A third in the Cheltenham Gold Cup preceded Desert Orchid's convincing win in the Irish Grand National at Fairyhouse. He was given top weight of 12 stone (76.2 kg), but was even money favourite and won by twelve lengths.  This was despite an uncharacteristic bad jump at the final fence.

Also in 1989, Desert Orchid was painted by the noted equine artist Barrie Linklater.

Desert Orchid did not reappear until November 1990, finishing second in the Haldon Gold Cup. A fourth in the Tingle Creek followed before the King George VI Chase, which he won for the fourth time.

Desert Orchid had three more races in the 1990–91 season, his last ever victory coming in the Agfa Diamond Chase at Sandown on 2 February 1991. His final start of the season was a 15-length third to Garrison Savannah in the Cheltenham Gold Cup.

In his last season, he was beaten in his first outing at Wincanton, the race he had made his own and which now bears his name. He finished third in the Peterborough Chase at Huntingdon before falling in his last race, the 1991 King George at Kempton, where he was attempting his fifth win.

His record at right-handed tracks such as Kempton was always substantially better than his record at left-handed tracks such as Cheltenham. He had a tendency to jump to his right especially when tired. This meant that at tracks such as Cheltenham he would lose lengths by drifting to the outside. This tendency can be seen by his runs in the 1987 and 1988 Queen Mother Champion Chase and 1989 and 1990 Cheltenham Gold Cup. On each occasion he entered the home straight wide of his rivals. He only raced left-handed on thirteen occasions.  However, all were either early in his career or in top-class races.  He raced more times at both Sandown (19) and Ascot (15) than he did left-handed.

His part-owner Richard Burridge has stated that it was for this reason that Desert Orchid would have struggled in the Grand National: connections felt he could do himself serious injury at the ninety-degree Canal Turn especially on the second circuit (ref. Richard Burridge: The Grey Horse: The True Story of Desert Orchid).

The official handicapper gave Desert Orchid a rating of 187. Whilst a very high rating, it could have been much higher had his performances on left-handed tracks matched those on right. His performances on left-handed tracks like Cheltenham, where, despite this aversion, he never finished out of the first three in a chase, are recognised as generally below par.

No horse since Desert Orchid has repeatedly and successfully conceded weight to his rivals at the highest level.

Desert Orchid won 34 of his 71 starts, amassing £654,066 in prize money.

Retirement
Desert Orchid retired in December 1991 and survived a life-threatening operation for colic a year later. He took his summer holidays with the Burridge family at Ab Kettleby, and spent the winter with David Elsworth leading out the 2 year olds and getting ready for his many public appearances. He returned every year to Kempton to lead out the parade of runners for the King George VI Chase.

During his retirement, he raised thousands of pounds for charity, and his presence at charity events attracted large crowds. His fan club was run by part owner Midge Burridge and family friend John Hippesley. In the 17 years that the fan club ran, they raised over £40,000 for charity through sales of Desert Orchid merchandise, especially his racing calendar.

When David Elsworth left Whitsbury after 25 years, Desert Orchid packed up and went with him to Egerton House Stables in Newmarket, Suffolk. But the home of champions and stallions welcomed the old gelding and his trainer with open arms and Newmarket racecourses held their annual press day in 2006 on Desert Orchid's 27th birthday at his stable. He also paraded at the course to the delight of his fans.

Desert Orchid was no longer ridden due to his age, and David announced that his appearances would be fewer, and nearer to home, as he was now such a senior citizen. Desert Orchid's last public appearance was on 1 October 2006 at his fan club open day, which was held at the National Stud in conjunction with stallion parades.

It was clear that Desert Orchid was now frail. In the week of 6 November 2006, he began to have trouble with coordination and those close to him were summoned to say goodbye. A vet was on standby should his assistance be needed. Last seen by those who loved him best at Egerton, he was lying down but nibbling his hay. One hour later at 6:05am, Monday 13 November, Desert Orchid died.<ref name="desert">

Desert Orchid's ashes were buried in a private ceremony at Kempton Park Racecourse near his statue the week prior to the King George. The inaugural running of the Desert Orchid Chase on the 27th was preceded by the unveiling of the headstone for his grave, videos of his finest hours at the track, and a moment's silence in his honour. The race was won by Voy Por Ustedes, trained by Alan King and owned by Sir Robert Ogden.

See also
 List of historical horses
 Repeat winners of horse races

External links
Official Desert Orchid Site

References

1979 racehorse births
2006 racehorse deaths
Cheltenham Gold Cup winners
Cheltenham Festival winners
National Hunt racehorses
Racehorses bred in the United Kingdom
Racehorses trained in the United Kingdom
Thoroughbred family 13-a
Horse monuments